Abkuh Aliabad (also Romanized as Ābḵūh ‘Alīābād) is a village in Pain Velayat Rural District, in the Central District of Kashmar County, Razavi Khorasan Province, Iran. At the 2006 census, its population was 16, in 5 families.

See also 

 List of cities, towns and villages in Razavi Khorasan Province

References 

Populated places in Kashmar County